"Pandora's Kiss" / "Don't Give Up" is a double A-side single released by English singer Louise in September 2003. It was her last single to be released until 2019's "Stretch". The single was released to raise money for the Tickled Pink campaign for Breast Cancer Care. Listeners noted that the chorus of "Don't Give Up" strongly resembles Asda's commercial marketing jingle; Asda admitted that it had been written by the same composer.

The double A-side reached number five on the UK Singles Chart and was re-released in 2019, being available on music download outlets and streaming to coincide with the release of Louise's fourth album, Heavy Love (2020). According to the Official Charts Company, "Pandora's Kiss" is Louise's 11th-highest-selling single in the UK. "Don't Give Up" was available only in Asda stores. The video for "Pandora's Kiss" was directed by Trudy Bellinger.

Track listings

UK CD1
 "Pandora's Kiss" (radio edit) – 3:12
 "Don't Give Up" (radio edit) – 3:29
 "Pandora's Kiss" (Goldtrix Freaktronic vocal mix) – 7:37

UK CD2
 "Don't Give Up" (radio edit) – 3:29
 "Pandora's Kiss" (radio edit) – 3:12
 "Pandora's Kiss" (D-Bop mix) – 7:37

UK DVD single
 "Pandora's Kiss" (the video) – 3:28
 Behind the scenes on the video – 1:57
 "Pandora's Kiss" (radio edit) – 3:12
 "Don't Give Up" (radio edit) – 3:29
 Photo gallery

Charts

Weekly charts

Year-end charts

References

2003 singles
2003 songs
Louise Redknapp songs
Music videos directed by Trudy Bellinger
Songs written by Reed Vertelney